Madison Township is an inactive township in Cedar County, in the U.S. state of Missouri.

Madison Township was established in the 1840s, taking its name from President James Madison.

References

Townships in Missouri
Townships in Cedar County, Missouri